Kotylio (also Κωτίλιο - Kotilio) is a village and a community in the municipal unit Gortyna, southwest Arcadia, Greece. It is situated on the northeastern slope of Mount Lykaion on a height of ca. 900 m,
 3 km from the border with Elis. It is 4 km west of Karytaina, 6 km southeast of Theisoa, 8 km east of Andritsaina and 15 km northwest of Megalopoli. In 2011 Kotylio had a population of 64 for the village and 82 for the community, which includes the villages Palatos (pop. 10) and Strongylo (pop. 8).

History
Before 1927, Kotylio was known as Dragoumano (Δραγουμάνο, cf. dragoman). During the first battles of the Greek War of Independence in March 1821, the inhabitants of the village provided the information on the movements of Ottoman troops. This allowed Theodoros Kolokotronis to ambush them on 27 March in the straits of Agiothanasis, near Kourounios, in what is considered the first pitched battle between Greeks and Turks during the War of Independence.

On top of Mount Lykaion, every four years, the locals organize athletic and musical games in imitation of the ancient custom.

Population

See also
List of settlements in Arcadia

References

External links
 Κοτύλιον Αρκαδίας
 History and information about Kotili
 Kotili on the GTP Travel Pages

Gortyna, Arcadia
Populated places in Arcadia, Peloponnese